Pterostylis sanguinea, commonly known as the red-banded greenhood or dark-banded greenhood, is a plant in the orchid family Orchidaceae and is endemic to southern Australia. The plants either have a rosette of leaves in the years when not flowering or stem leaves on a flowering spike. When flowering, it has up to about twelve flowers which are dark reddish-brown, sometimes green or green and brown with the dorsal sepal and petals joined, forming a hood over the column. It is a common and widespread orchid, found in Western Australia, South Australia, Victoria and, rarely, in Tasmania. [[File:Pterostylis sanguinea (9186545905).jpg|thumb|225px|Green form of P. sanguinea]] 

DescriptionPterostylis sanguinea, is a terrestrial,  perennial, deciduous, herb with an underground tuber. The dorsal sepal and petals form a hood over the column. Flowering occurs from June to September.

Taxonomy and namingPterostylis sanguinea was first formally described in 1989 by Mark Clements and the description was published in Australian Orchid Research from a specimen collected in Belair Recreation Reserve (now Belair National Park) in South Australia. The specific epithet (sanguinea) is a Latin word meaning "bloody" or "blood-red" referring to the sometimes blood red colour of the flowers of this species.

Distribution and habitatPterostylis sanguinea occurs in Western Australia from north of Kalbarri in the north to Toolinna Cove in the east, in the south-east of South Australia and in disjunct areas of Victoria, west from Yarram. In Tasmania it is only found in the Strzelecki National Park on Flinders Island. It grows in forest and woodland in well-drained soils.<ref>{{cite web|title=Census of South Australian Plants - Pterostylis|url=http://www.flora.sa.gov.au/cgi-bin/census_display.cgi?family=&genus=Pterostylis&species=&content=search&style=book&format=HTML&submit=Search&synonym=1|publisher=State Herbarium of South Australia|accessdate=30 April 2017}}</ref>

Conservation
Pterostylis sanguinea is classified as "not threatened" by the Government of Western Australia Department of Parks and Wildlife. In Tasmania it is classed as "rare" under the Threatened Species Protection Act 1995.

References

sanguinea
Endemic orchids of Australia
Orchids of South Australia
Orchids of Tasmania
Orchids of Victoria (Australia)
Orchids of Western Australia
Plants described in 1989